Rakesh Kumar Yadav (born 01 july 1993) is an Indian track and field athlete from Uttar Pradesh who specializes in Hammer throw. Kumar set the Indian National record of 70.16m in the discipline on 17 July 2003 during the Second National Athletic Circuit Meet in Bangalore. He erased the 70.13 metre mark of Ishtiaq Ahamed set there in the year 2000.

References

External links

 
 

Living people
1981 births
Athletes from Uttar Pradesh
Indian male hammer throwers